Belma Šmrković (Serbian Cyrillic: Белма Шмрковић; born August 14, 1990 in Sjenica) is a Serbian cross-country skier who has competed since 2003. At the 2010 Winter Olympics in Vancouver, she finished 78th in the individual sprint event.

Šmrković finished 90th in the individual sprint event at the FIS Nordic World Ski Championships 2009 in Liberec.

Her lone victory was at a 5 km event in Kruševo, Macedonia in 2008.

She now works as physic teacher in Novi Pazar, Serbia.

References

1990 births
Living people
People from Sjenica
Olympic cross-country skiers of Serbia
Serbian female cross-country skiers
Cross-country skiers at the 2010 Winter Olympics